Mikhail Zayats (born October 14, 1981) is an ethnic Russian professional mixed martial artist currently competing in Bellator's Light Heavyweight division. He has also competed in M-1 Global. According to the global-mma.com rankings, he is the 7th ranked Light Heavyweight in the world (outside of the UFC).

Mixed martial arts career

M-1 Global
Mikhail Zayats defeated powerful Georgian wrestler David Tkeshelashvili by rear-naked choke submission at 2:26 in the first round.

Zayats faced Malik Merad on April 28, 2011 at М-1 Challenge XXV: Zavurov vs. Enomoto. He won via TKO (punches) in the second round.

Zayats faced Vinny Magalhães on October 14, 2011 at М-1 Challenge XXVII: Garner vs. Grishin for the M-1 Global Light Heavyweight Championship. He lost via TKO (head kick and punches) in the third round.

Bellator MMA
Mikhail Zayats was signed in Bellator and will perform on Bellator Fighting Championships: Season Eight Light Heavyweight Tournament Opening Round in 2013 on Spike TV.

In his Bellator debut, Zayats faced Brazilian MMA legend and former Strikeforce Light Heavyweight Champion Renato Sobral in the Light Jeavyweight Yournament on January 17, 2013 at Bellator 85.  He won the fight via TKO in the first round.

In the semifinal, Zayats faced Jacob Noe. This fight is expected to occur on February 21, 2013 at Bellator 90. He won the fight in dominant fashion, ending it with an armbar submission in the first round.

Zayats faced Emanuel Newton on March 28, 2013 in Bellator Season Eight Light Heavyweight Tournament at Bellator 94. He lost via unanimous decision. Post-fight, Zayats confirmed that he suffered a rib injury just days before the fight. The injury would keep him out of the upcoming Bellator Summer Series.

Zayats faced Aaron Rosa on October 11, 2013 at Bellator 103. He won the fight via submission.

Zayats entered into the Bellator season ten Light Heavyweight tournament on February 28, 2014. He faced Muhammed Lawal in the semifinals at Bellator 110 and lost the fight via unanimous decision.

Championships and accomplishments

Mixed martial arts
Bellator MMA
Bellator Season Eight Light Heavyweight Tournament Runner-Up
M-1 Global
M-1 Challenge 2008 Championships.

Ju-Jitsu
Ju-Jitsu International Federation (JJIF)
Ju-Jitsu European Champion.

ARG (Army Hand-to-Hand Combat)
Russian Union of Martial Arts
Russian National Champion of Army Hand-to-Hand Combat

Sambo
All-Russian Sambo Federation
Combat Sambo Russia National Champion.
Federation International Amateur de Sambo (FIAS)
2008 FIAS World Combat Sambo Championships Gold Medalist.

Mixed martial arts record

|-
| Win
| align=center| 24–8
| Caio Magalhaes
| Decision (unanimous)
| M-1 Challenge 91 - Swain vs. Nuertiebieke
| 
| align=center| 3
| align=center| 5:00
| Shenzhen, China
| Middleweight debut
|-
| Win
| align=center| 23–8
| Marcus Vanttinen
| Decision (unanimous)
| M-1 Challenge 82 - Vanttinen vs. Zayats
| 
| align=center| 3
| align=center| 5:00
| Helsinki, Finland
| 
|-
| Loss
| align=center| 22–8
| Muhammed Lawal
| Decision (unanimous)
| Bellator 110
| 
| align=center| 3
| align=center| 5:00
| Uncasville, Connecticut, United States
| 
|-
| Win
| align=center| 22–7
| Aaron Rosa
| Submission (kimura)
| Bellator 103
| 
| align=center| 1
| align=center| 0:47
| Mulvane, Kansas, United States
| 
|-
| Loss
| align=center| 21–7
| Emanuel Newton
| Decision (unanimous)
| Bellator 94
| 
| align=center| 3
| align=center| 5:00
| Tampa, Florida, United States
| Bellator Season Eight Light Heavyweight Tournament Final.
|-
| Win
| align=center| 21–6
| Jacob Noe
| Submission (armbar)
| Bellator 90
| 
| align=center| 1
| align=center| 3:38
| West Valley City, Utah, United States
| Bellator Season Eight Light Heavyweight Tournament Semifinal.
|-
| Win
| align=center| 20–6
| Renato Sobral
| TKO (spinning back fist and punches)
| Bellator 85
| 
| align=center| 1
| align=center| 4:49
| Irvine, California, United States
| Bellator Season 8 Light Heavyweight Tournament Quarterfinal.
|-
| Win
| align=center| 19–6
| Marcin Elsner
| Submission (guillotine choke)
| Abu Dhabi Warriors 1
| 
| align=center| 2
| align=center| 4:44
| Abu Dhabi, United Arab Emirates
| 
|-
| Win
| align=center| 18–6
| Mathias Schuck
| Decision (unanimous)
| Cup of Peresvet
| 
| align=center| 3
| align=center| 5:00
| Bryansk, Russia
| 
|-
| Win
| align=center| 17–6
| Alexei Varagushin
| TKO (punches)
| League S-70: Russian Championship Finals
| 
| align=center| 1
| align=center| 3:17
| Sochi, Russia
| 
|-
| Win
| align=center| 16–6
| Bogdan Savchenko
| Submission (guillotine choke)
| IMAT: Third Round
| 
| align=center| 2
| align=center| 1:28
| Bryansk, Russia
| 
|-
| Win
| align=center| 15–6
| Juha Saarinen
| TKO (doctor stoppage)
| Cage 18: Turku
| 
| align=center| 2
| align=center| 3:36
| Turku, Finland
| 
|-
| Loss
| align=center| 14–6
| Vinny Magalhães
| TKO (head kick and punches)
| M-1 Challenge 27: Magalhaes vs. Zayats
| 
| align=center| 3
| align=center| 1:13
| Phoenix, Arizona, United States
| For M-1 Global Light Heavyweight Championship.
|-
| Win
| align=center| 14–5
| Malik Merad
| TKO (punches)
| M-1 Challenge 25: Zavurov vs. Enomoto
| 
| align=center| 2
| align=center| 0:49
| St. Petersburg, Russia
| 
|-
| Win
| align=center| 13–5
| David Tkeshelashvili
| Submission (rear-naked choke)
| M-1 Challenge 22: Narkun vs. Vasilevsky
| 
| align=center| 1
| align=center| 2:26
| Moscow, Russia
| 
|-
| Win
| align=center| 12–5
| Matias Baric
| Submission (rear-naked choke)
| M-1 Challenge 21: Guram vs. Garner
| 
| align=center| 3
| align=center| 3:12
| St. Petersburg, Russia
| 
|-
| Win
| align=center| 11–5
| Toni Valtonen
| Submission (armbar)
| Fight Festival Goes Kaisaniemi
| 
| align=center| 1
| align=center| 4:45
| Helsinki, Finland
| 
|-
| Loss
| align=center| 10–5
| Robert Jocz
| TKO (punches)
| BOTE: Chahbari vs. Souwer
| 
| align=center| 2
| align=center| 4:05
| Zutphen, Netherlands
| 
|-
| Win
| align=center| 10–4
| Lee Sang-Soo
| Decision (unanimous)
| M-1 Challenge 20: 2009 Finals
| 
| align=center| 3
| align=center| 5:00
| St. Petersburg, Russia
| 
|-
| Loss
| align=center| 9–4
| Lucio Linhares
| Submission (rear-naked choke)
| M-1 Global: Breakthrough
| 
| align=center| 1
| align=center| 1:00
| Kansas City, Kansas, United States
| 
|-
| Loss
| align=center| 9–3
| Alexandre Machado
| Decision (unanimous)
| M-1 Challenge 15: Brazil
| 
| align=center| 3
| align=center| 5:00
| São Paulo, Brazil
| 
|-
| Loss
| align=center| 9–2
| Jae Young Kim
| TKO (head kick)
| M-1 Challenge 12: USA
| 
| align=center| 2
| align=center| 4:02
| Tacoma, Washington, United States
| 
|-
| Win
| align=center| 9–1
| David Haagsma
| Submission (armbar)
| M-1 Challenge 11: 2009 Challenge Finals
| 
| align=center| 1
| align=center| 3:25
| Amstelveen, Netherlands
| <small>Won M-1 Challenge GP team.
|-
| Win
| align=center| 8–1
| Seung Bae Whi
| Decision (majority)
| M-1 Challenge 9: Russia
| 
| align=center| 2
| align=center| 5:00
| St. Petersburg, Russia
| 
|-
| Win
| align=center| 7–1
| Alexei Kalistartov
| Submission (armbar)
| RMAU: Battle of the Champions 3
| 
| align=center| 1
| align=center| 2:24
| Moscow, Russia
| 
|-
| Win
| align=center| 6–1
| John Cornett
| Submission (hand injury)
| M-1 Challenge 7: UK
| 
| align=center| 2
| align=center| 0:44
| Nottingham, England
| 
|-
| Win
| align=center| 5–1
| Lucio Linhares
| Decision (unanimous)
| M-1 Challenge 4: Battle on the Neva 2
| 
| align=center| 2
| align=center| 5:00
| St. Petersburg, Russia
| 
|-
| Loss
| align=center| 4–1
| Daniel Tabera
| Submission (rear-naked choke)
| M-1 MFC: Fedor Emelianenko Cup
| 
| align=center| 1
| align=center| 1:59
| Belgorod, Russia
| 
|-
| Win
| align=center| 4–0
| Christophe Daffreville
| Decision (unanimous)
| M-1: Slamm
| 
| align=center| 2
| align=center| 5:00
| Almere, Netherlands
| 
|-
| Win
| align=center| 3–0
| Lukasz Jurkowski
| Submission (arm-triangle choke)
| M-1 MFC: Battle on the Neva
| 
| align=center| 3
| align=center| N/A
| St. Petersburg, Russia
| 
|-
| Win
| align=center| 2–0
| Jin O'Kim
| Submission (armbar)
| M-1 MFC: Russia vs. Korea 
| 
| align=center| 1
| align=center| 2:00
| Seoul, South Korea
| 
|-
| Win
| align=center| 1–0
| Christophe Durant
| Decision (unanimous)
| M-1 MFC: Mix-Fight
| 
| align=center| 3
| align=center| 5:00
| Belgorod, Russia
|

References

External links

Living people
Russian male mixed martial artists
Light heavyweight mixed martial artists
Mixed martial artists utilizing ARB
Mixed martial artists utilizing sambo
Mixed martial artists utilizing jujutsu
Mixed martial artists utilizing Brazilian jiu-jitsu
Russian jujutsuka
Russian practitioners of Brazilian jiu-jitsu
Russian sambo practitioners
1981 births